Walter Evans was an English footballer who played as a striker for Athletic Club. He was one of the first pioneers of football in the Basque Country, standing out as a great striker for some of the earliest Basque clubs in existence such as Bilbao FC, Club Bizcaya, and Athletic Club, winning three back-to-back Spanish Cups between 1902 and 1904, and being the joint top scorer in the 1902 Copa de la Coronación with 5 goals. The dates of his birth and death are unknown.

Playing career

Bilbao Football Club
Evans was born in England and at some point, at the turn of the century, he arrived in Bilbao due to work reasons. In 1901, together with fellow Englishmen, George Langford, George Cockram and William Dyer, he was one of the young English workers and residents in Bilbao who joined the recently established Bilbao Football Club. At the end of 1901, the two most important clubs in the city were Bilbao FC and Athletic Club, so a rivalry soon arose between them, and they played several friendlies at the Hippodrome of Lamiako. Evans played a fundamental role in this historic rivalry, netting a total of three goals in four matches, including one in a 1–1 draw on 1 December 1901 and the only goal in a 1–0 win on 15 December, thus sealing Bilbao FC's first-ever win over their city rivals. On 19 January 1902, Evans scored a consolation goal in a 4–2 loss, in a match that went down in history as the first time that a paid match was held in Biscay, since they charged a ticket price of 30 cents of a peseta.

Club Bizcaya
The two rivals agreed to join the best players of each club to play two games against the Bordeaux-based side Burdigala. This temporary merge became known as Club Bizcaya, and Evans ousted Athletic's forwards for a spot in the first-ever line-up of the Bizcaya team against Burdigala on 9 March, netting once in an 2–0 win in France, the first time a Bilbao team played on foreign territory.

Together with Juan Astorquia, Armand Cazeaux and fellow Englishman William Dyer, Evans was part of the Bizcaya team that participated in the 1902 Copa de la Coronacion, the first national championship disputed in Spain and the forerunner for the Copa del Rey. In the quarter-finals on 13 May, he scored a hat-trick against Club Espanyol (now RCD Espanyol) to help his side to a 5–1 win. On the following day, Evans netted a brace in the semi-finals in an 8–1 trashing of New Foot-Ball Club, thus helping Athletic reach the final, in which he started in a 2–1 victory over FC Barcelona. These five goals earned him the top spot in the top scorers of the tournament alongside his teammate William Dyer, who also scored five goals for Biscaya.

Athletic Club
In 1903, Bilbao FC collapsed and its remaining members were officially absorbed by Athletic Club. Together with Juan Astorquia, Alejandro de la Sota, and fellow Englishman George Cockram, Evans was part of the Athletic team that participated in the 1903 Copa del Rey, the first-ever official edition of the competition. He scored once in the semi-finals to help his side to a 4–1 win over Club Espanyol. Evans featured in the final in which he helped his side to a 3–2 comeback win over Madrid FC (now known as Real Madrid).

Evans played five competitive matches and scored six competitive goals for Athletic between 1902 and 1905 (Athletic Bilbao counts the matches played by Club Vizcaya as its own). He was also part of the team that won the 1904 Copa del Rey, which Athletic won without playing a single match since their opponents failed to turn up.

Honours
Club Bizcaya
Copa de la Coronación: 1902

Athletic Club
Copa del Rey: 1903, 1904

References

Year of birth missing
Year of death missing
English footballers
Athletic Bilbao footballers
Association football forwards
English expatriate sportspeople in Spain
Expatriate footballers in Spain
English expatriate footballers